Remada Air Base  is a military airport serving Remada in Tunisia.

See also
Transport in Tunisia

References

 OurAirports - Tunisia
  Great Circle Mapper - Remada AB
 Remada AB
 Google Earth

Airports in Tunisia